The Cyclopean Isles (Italian: Isole Ciclopi), noted for their rows of basaltic columns piled one above another, lie not far from Mount Etna off the eastern coast of Sicily in the Mediterranean Sea.

Geology
Formed about 500,000 years ago, the Cyclopean Isles are of volcanic origin and may at one time have been attached to Sicily.

The Cyclopean Isles strongly resemble the Giant's Causeway on the northern coast of Northern Ireland, and the Isle of Staffa off the western coast of Scotland. The latter, closest in appearance to the Cyclopean pair, differs mainly in having the columns piled in terraces, one above another.

Homer's legend
There is an ancient tradition that the islands at one time formed part of the mainland of Sicily.

Homer has a curious story about the manner in which they became detached, towards the end of the ninth book of the Odyssey. When Odysseus visited Sicily it was inhabited by the Cyclopes, said to have had only one eye, on the forehead.

Odysseus encounters one of their number, Polyphemus, on his journey home to Ithaca, who kills two of Odysseus's men. Stuck inside Polyphemus's cave because he and his men are unable to move the boulder that blocks the entrance, Odysseus supplies Polyphemus with a special wine until he falls asleep, and blinds him by drilling the Cyclops's own wooden walking stick into his eye. Polyphemus opens the cave boulder and the Greeks escape to their ship; Polyphemus calls to the other Cyclopes for help and Odysseus, from the distance of his ship, begins to taunt and to jeer at him. Homer (Alexander Pope's translation) says:

Odysseus boasts that it was "Odysseus... Son of Laertes" who had burnt out Polyphemus's eye. Polyphemus invokes the vengeance of his father Poseidon, and:

Islands of Sicily
Volcanoes of Italy
Columnar basalts
Mediterranean islands
Archipelagoes of Italy